The Mueller Homestead is a historic house in Utica, South Dakota. It was built in 1905, and designed in the Late Victorian architectural style, with a gable roof designed in the stick style. The house has been listed on the National Register of Historic Places since April 16, 1980.

References

National Register of Historic Places in Yankton County, South Dakota
Victorian architecture in South Dakota
Stick-Eastlake architecture in the United States
Houses completed in 1905
1905 establishments in South Dakota